Stephen John Crawford is a Canadian politician who currently serves as the parliamentary assistant to the Minister of Finance.

He was first elected to the Legislative Assembly of Ontario in the 2018 provincial election and again in the 2022 provincial election. He represents the riding of Oakville as a member of the Progressive Conservative Party of Ontario.

Early life 
Stephen Crawford was born in Mississauga, Ontario, to his parents William and Diane Crawford. He grew up in Mississauga, the youngest of three children and attended Lorne Park Secondary School.

Education 
Crawford attended the University of Western Ontario where he completed his Bachelor of Arts degree in political science. He also holds a Business Diploma from the University of Toronto, and a Leadership Program Certificate from Queen's University. Crawford also earned his Chartered Investment Manager (CIM) designation.

Business career 
Crawford worked as a senior executive at Acuity Funds Ltd.

Political career 
In 2017, Crawford ran for the Progressive Conservative Party of Ontario nomination in the riding of Oakville, defeating his opponents in the second round of voting. In the 2018 Ontario General Election, Crawford ran against Liberal candidate, and long-time incumbent, Kevin Flynn. Crawford defeated Flynn by 4,510 votes, ending his 15-year tenure as Oakville's MPP.

On August 9, 2018, Crawford was named the chair of the Finance and Economic Affairs Committee.

Crawford announced his first private members bill, Bill 55, also known as Safeguarding Our Information Act, 2018. The main purpose of Bill 55 is to prevent government institutions from accessing the private financial data of Ontario residents without their consent. The bill is a reaction to the federal government's inaction on the news of Statistics Canada proposing to access the financial records of 500,000 Canadians.

On June 26, 2019, Crawford was named the Parliamentary Assistant to the Minister of Infrastructure. He served in this role from 2019-2021.

On June 21, 2021, Crawford sent a letter to Oakville Mayor Rob Burton urging the town to request a Ministerial Zoning Order to protect Glen Abbey Golf Course from a proposed development. The development was cancelled in July 2021.

In July 2021, Crawford was appointed to the role of Parliamentary Assistant to the Minister of Energy, a position he held until 2022.

On June 29, 2022, Stephen was sworn in as the Parliamentary Assistant to the Minister of Finance, which is the position he currently holds.

Personal life
Crawford resides in Oakville, Ontario with his wife Najia and children.

Crawford is the great grand-nephew of famous Irish-born Canadian writer, Isabella Valancy Crawford.

Awards and recognition

In 2019, Crawford and fellow MPP Effie Triantafilopoulos were presented with keys to the Town of Oakville "for their work on the regional review process and strong representation of the voice of Oakville residents".

In 2021, Crawford received a second key to the Town of Oakville, alongside Premier Doug Ford and fellow MPPs Triantafilopoulos and Steve Clark, for their role in saving the Glen Abbey golf course.

Electoral record

References

External links

Progressive Conservative Party of Ontario MPPs
21st-century Canadian politicians
Living people
People from Oakville, Ontario
Politicians from Mississauga
Year of birth missing (living people)